Walter Donaldson (February 15, 1893 – July 15, 1947) was an American prolific popular songwriter and publishing company founder, composing many hit songs of the 1910s to 1940s, that have become standards and form part of the Great American Songbook.

History
Walter Donaldson was born in Brooklyn, New York State, United States, the son of a piano teacher. While still in school he wrote original music for school productions, and had his first professional songs published in 1915. In 1918, he had his first major hit with "The Daughter of Rosie O'Grady".

During World War I, Donaldson entertained troops at Camp Upton, New York.  His time there inspired him to write "How Ya Gonna Keep 'em Down on the Farm (After They've Seen Paree)?"

After serving in the United States Army in World War I, Donaldson was hired as a songwriter by Irving Berlin Music Company. He stayed with Berlin until 1928, producing many hit songs, then in 1928 established his own publishing company. Although Walter Donaldson's company was officially known as "Donaldson, Douglas & Gumble, Inc.," it was printed in fine print alongside Walter Donaldson's name in every publication.

Donaldson frequently worked with lyricist Gus Kahn.

Donaldson is primarily known as a composer, rather than as a lyricist, although he wrote words and music for dozens of songs. Among the big hits for which he wrote both words and music were "At Sundown" and "Little White Lies".  In his prolific career, he published some 600 original songs.

At the end of the 1920s, Donaldson moved to Hollywood, California, and worked composing and arranging music for motion pictures. His film credits include work on such pictures as Glorifying the American Girl, Suzy, The Great Ziegfeld, Panama Hattie, Follow the Boys and Nevada. He married Dorothy in 1935, who was on the New York stage as Wanda Mansfield, but they divorced in 1942 after having two children.

Walter Donaldson retired in 1943, and died four years later in Santa Monica, California, after being ill for a year with kidney problems. He is buried at an unmarked grave at the Holy Cross Cemetery in Brooklyn.

Selected works
 "At Sundown (When Love is Calling Me Home)"
 "The Army's Full of Irish (A Man from Erin Never Runs, He's Irish)" (lyrics by Bert Hanlon)
 "Away Down East in Maine"
 "Because My Baby Don't Mean 'Maybe' Now"
 "Carolina in the Morning" (lyrics by Gus Kahn)
 "Can't We Fall in Love" (lyrics by Harold Adamson)
 "Did I Remember" (lyrics by Harold Adamson)
 "Dixie Vagabond" (lyrics by Gus Kahn)
 "Don't Be Angry"
 "Don't Cry Frenchy, Don't Cry" (lyrics by Sam M. Lewis and Joe Young)
 "Down Where the South Begins" (lyrics by Gus Kahn)
 "Dreamy Delaware" (music by "Violinsky" (Sol Ginsberg))
 "Duke of Kak-I-Ak" (lyrics by Edgar Leslie)
 "Eight Little Letters"
 "An Ev'ning in Caroline"
 "For No Reason at All" (lyrics by Sam M. Lewis and Joe Young)
 "Georgia"
 "A Girlfriend of a Boyfriend of Mine" (lyrics by Gus Kahn)
 "Give Me Just a Little Bit of What You've Got" (lyrics by George A. Whiting)
 "Give Me My Mammy" (lyrics by Buddy DeSylva)
 "Goodness Gracious Agnes" (lyrics by Gus Kahn)
 "How Ya Gonna Keep 'em Down on the Farm (After They've Seen Paree)? (lyrics by Sam M. Lewis and Joe Young)
 "Kansas City Kitty" (lyrics by Edgar Leslie)
 "Little White Lies"
 "Love Me or Leave Me" (lyrics by Gus Kahn)
 "Makin' Whoopee" (lyrics by Gus Kahn)
 "Maybe It's the Moon" (lyrics by Robert Wright and Chet Forrest)
 "Mississippi Honeymoon" (lyrics by Gus Kahn)
 "Mister Meadowlark" (lyrics by Johnny Mercer)
 "My Baby Just Cares for Me" (lyrics by Gus Kahn)
 "My Blue Heaven" (lyrics by George A. Whiting)
 "My Buddy" (lyrics by Gus Kahn)
 "My Heart and I Decided"
 "My Little Bimbo Down on a Bamboo Isle" (lyrics by Grant Clarke)
 "My Mammy" (lyrics by Sam M. Lewis and Joe Young) (a huge hit for Al Jolson)
 "My Man from Caroline" (lyrics by Gus Kahn)
 "My Ohio Home" (lyrics by Gus Kahn)
 "My Papa Doesn't Two-Time No Time"
 "No One to Blame But Myself" (lyrics by Mitchell Parish)
 "Out of the Dawn"
 "Sam, the Old Accordion Man"
 "Sweet Jennie Lee"
 "That Certain Party" (lyrics by Gus Kahn)
 "A Thousand Goodnights"
 "What Can I Say After I Say I'm Sorry?" (lyrics by Abe Lyman)
 "Why'd Ya Make Me Fall In Love?"
 "Without That Gal!"
 "Yes Sir, That's My Baby" (lyrics by Gus Kahn)
 "You're Driving Me Crazy"

References

Bibliography
Holsinger, M. Paul, "How Ya Gonna Keep 'Em Down on the Farm?" (Song) in War and American Popular Culture: A Historical Encyclopedia. Edited by M Paul Holsinger, Westport, CT: Greenwood Press, 1999.

External links

 Walter Donaldson's Official Website
 Walter Donaldson recordings at the Discography of American Historical Recordings.
 Walter Donaldson (1893-1947) - Find A Grave... find-a-grave site for Walter Donaldson
 Sheet music for How Ya Gonna Keep 'em Down on the Farm (After They've Seen Paree)?', Waterson, Berlin & Snyder Co., 1919.
 

Sheet music and MP3 for "The Army's Full of Irish"

1893 births
1947 deaths
Songwriters from New York (state)
20th-century American musicians
Burials at Holy Cross Cemetery, Brooklyn
United States Army soldiers